Omnicom Group Inc. is an American global media, marketing and corporate communications holding company, headquartered in New York City.

Omnicom's branded networks and specialty firms provide services in four disciplines: advertising, customer relationship management (CRM), public relations and specialty services. The services included in these disciplines are media planning and buying, digital and interactive marketing, sports and events marketing, field marketing and brand consultancy. Omnicom Group was ranked as one of the four largest advertising agencies in the world by The New York Times in 2002. In 2014, Omnicom was considered the second largest advertising holding company by The Wall Street Journal. The company employs more than 77,000 employees in over 100 countries worldwide.

History
In 1986, Allen Rosenshine, Keith Reinhard and John Bernbach (son of William Bernbach) co-created Omnicom in a three-way merger of BBDO Worldwide, Doyle Dane Bernbach and Needham Harper Worldwide. In 1989, Rosenshine stepped down as chairman of Omnicom to return to his role running BBDO Worldwide and Bruce Crawford (who had preceded Rosenshine as CEO of BBDO before leaving to run the Metropolitan Opera in 1985)
was named chairman of Omnicom. In 1997, John Wren, the number two executive at Omnicom, became the company's chief executive officer, while Crawford remained as chairman.

In July 2013, it was announced that Publicis Groupe and Omnicom Group would merge to form Publicis Omnicom Group, but by May 2014 it was announced that the deal had fallen through and the Publicis-Omnicom  merger would not happen.

By 2014, Omnicom was the second largest agency holding company and had revenue of over $15 billion. Omnicom launched Omniwomen in April 2014 with the goal of  increasing the number and influence of female leaders within the organization. Omniwomen has more than 10 branches in the US, UK, Canada, France, Germany, China and the UAE.

In July 2017, Omnicom announced that Gracia Martore, former President and CEO of TEGNA Inc., had joined its Board as an independent director. Her appointment brings the total to 13 directors, 11 of which are independent. In February 2018, Ronnie S. Hawkins was appointed to the company's board as an independent director, bringing the total to 14 members, 12 of which are independent. In May 2018, Omnicom Group brought its language strategy agency, maslansky + partners, to Australia.

In November 2021, Daryl Simm was promoted to president and COO. That next month, Florian Adamski was announced as the next CEO of Omnicom Media Group, after previously working as CEO at OMD Worldwide.

Operations
Omnicom is composed of five major agency networks that oversee 1500+ agencies as parent companies. The networks are BBDO Worldwide, Diversified Agency Services (DAS), DDB Worldwide, Omnicom Media Group (OMG) and TBWA Worldwide.

BBDO Worldwide, one of the companies present from the initial merger, is a creative agency which has been recognized as one of the most creative networks in the world. Founded in 2000, Proximity Worldwide is BBDO's digitally focused marketing arm. In January 2016, BBDO Worldwide acquired a majority stake in Wednesday Agency Group. At the 2017 Cannes Lions International Festival of Creativity, BBDO Worldwide was awarded Network of the Year for the sixth time. Clemenger BBDO Melbourne was named Agency of the Year. BBDO was the top agency network featured in the 2018 WARC 100, an annual ranking of advertising and media effectiveness. In 2018, several of the BBDO agencies were ranked in the top 10 awarded individual agencies in the world by The Gunn Report.

The DAS Group of Companies comprises more than 200 companies focused on public relations, CRM, healthcare, events, promotional marketing, vehicle testing, branding and research. In 2016 and 2017, Omnicom formed two separate holding groups for healthcare and PR agencies: Omnicom Health Group and Omnicom Precision Marketing Group. Later in 2016, Omnicom Health Group acquired majority stakes in Biopharm Communications and Rabin Martin. In 2018, Omnicom Health Group acquired Snow Companies a patient engagement communications agency. Also in 2018, Omnicom Precision Marketing Group acquired a majority stake in Credera.

DDB Worldwide, one of the three initial companies, is a global advertising network. In November 2015, DDB Worldwide acquired Grupo ABC, the largest advertising group in Brazil. In June 2016, DDB Health was launched as a combination of healthcare agencies, which added medical and healthcare services to DDB's profile. Some of the businesses included in the DDB Worldwide unit are Tribal Worldwide, TracyLocke, adam&eveDDB, Roberts + Langer, Spike DDB, Rodgers Townsend, ONC Worldwide, Alma and Uproar!@DDB.

Omnicom Media Group is the media division of the Omnicom Group Inc. In 2017, three Omnicom Media Group agency networks competed at the Cannes Lions International Festival of Creativity, including OMD Worldwide, which was named Media Network of the Year.

TBWA is a global agency network, normally billed as 'The Disruption Company'. It was purchased in 1993 and then merged with the Chiat Day firm in 1995. In the United States, some of the company's offices still retain the TBWA Chiat Day name. Companies operating under the TBWA network include, Media Arts Lab, Digital Arts Network (DAN), The Integer Group, Lucky Generals, Designory, NEBOKO, and other TBWA branded regional agencies.

See also
 History of advertising

References

External links
 
 

American companies established in 1986
Companies listed on the New York Stock Exchange
Advertising agencies of the United States
Companies based in New York City
Holding companies established in 1986
1986 establishments in New York City